Sean Mcdonough Daniel (שון דניאל; born May 4, 1989) is an Israeli former professional basketball player. He played the small forward position. He was named the 2012 Israeli Basketball Premier League Most Improved Player.

Biography
Daniel was born in Ramat Gan, Israel. He is 6' 6" (198 cm) tall.

He played in the 2004 FIBA Europe Under-16 Championship and 2005 FIBA Europe Under-16 Championship, 2006 FIBA Europe Under-18 Championship and 2007 FIBA Europe Under-18 Championship, and 2008 FIBA Europe Under-20 Championship and 2009 FIBA Europe Under-18 Championship. Daniel also played in the 2011 Summer Universiade.

Daniel played as a professional for Hapoel Holon and Maccabi Ashdod. He was named the 2012 Israeli Basketball Premier League Most Improved Player.

References 

1989 births
Living people
Sportspeople from Ramat Gan
Hapoel Holon players
Israeli men's basketball players
Small forwards
Competitors at the 2011 Summer Universiade